The 2014 Sports Authority Mountain West Football Championship Game determined the 2014 football champion of the Mountain West Conference (MW). The game featured the Mountain Division champion Boise State Broncos hosting the West Division champion Fresno State Bulldogs.  Boise State was ranked #22 in the AP Poll, USA Today Coaches' Poll, and College Football Playoff Rankings.

References

Championship Game
Mountain West Conference Football Championship Game
Boise State Broncos football games
Fresno State Bulldogs football games
Mountain West Conference Football Championship Game
Mountain West Conference Football